Cuenca de Campos is a municipality of Spain in the region of Tierra de Campos in Valladolid province, autonomous community of Castile and León.

Economy
Its economy is based on agriculture, cereals (wheat, barley, oats), and legumes (alfalfa and chickpeas), and livestock.

References

External links

cigunuela.es
Canal Pueblos

Municipalities in the Province of Valladolid